Terri Burns is an investor and partner at GV (formerly Google Ventures). After joining the company in 2017 as a principal, she was promoted and became the youngest partner and first Black woman partner at GV in 2020.

Early life and education
Burns was born on February 22, 1994 and was raised in California. She graduated from New York University's Courant Institute of Mathematical Sciences with a bachelor’s degree in computer science in 2016, and in 2021, became the youngest member in history to serve on the university's Board of Trustees.

Career
Burns joined the GV team in 2017 as a principal investor. In 2020, she became the youngest partner and first Black woman partner at GV. In 2021, she became the youngest member of the NYU Board of Trustees at age 27, and was named to the Forbes 30 Under 30 list. Her first investment was a $1 million seed round in Have a Great Summer (HAGS), a Gen-Z-founded startup and social network. Previously, she was a front-end engineer at Venmo and an associate product manager at Twitter where she met the GV team.

Burns was also a contributing writer for publications including Teen Vogue and Forbes, documenting her journey into product management and the technology sector.

Awards
2021: GCV Rising Stars Award
2020: Forbes 30 Under 30

References

External links 
 

1994 births
Living people
American software engineers
Software engineers
Computer programmers
American women engineers
African-American computer scientists
American women computer scientists
American computer scientists
21st-century African-American people
21st-century African-American women
New York University people